Jalsa is an 2016 Marathi language comedy film directed by Ashutosh Raj. The film stars Bharat Ganeshpure, Sagar Karande, Abhijit Chavan, Ashutosh Raj, Nikhil Wairagar, Girija Joshi and Shital Ahirrao in pivotal roles. Story of the film is written by Ashutosh Raj and Abhiram Bhadkamkar. The film is produced by Studio 9 Entertainment and Ashutosh Raj. In this film, Mansi Naik will be seen performing on song "Bai Vadyavar Ya" as tribute to legendary Marathi actor Nilu Phule. This song is composed by Sameer Saptiskar, choreographed by Rajesh Bidve and sung by Anand Shinde.

Plot
The story of this film is about two youngsters Amar (Ashutosh Raj) & Prem (Nikhil Wairagar) from Pune from rich family, who are keen on taking up acting as their career, much against the wish of their parents. But their maternal uncle (Bharat Ganeshpure) encourages and helps them.

Cast
 Bharat Ganeshpure as Mama
 Ashutosh Raj as Amar
 Nikhil Wairagar as Prem
 Sagar Karande as Sangram Vetole
 Abhijeet Chavan as Nageshrao Vetole
 Girija Joshi as Karuna
 Shital Ahirrao as Nidhi
 Manasi Naik - Special appearance in song "Bai Vadyavar Ya"

Soundtrack

References

2010s Marathi-language films
2016 films
2016 masala films
Indian romantic comedy-drama films
2016 romantic comedy-drama films
Indian coming-of-age comedy-drama films
2016 comedy films
2016 drama films
2010s coming-of-age comedy-drama films